Saba Sahar (born 28 August 1975) is an Afghan actress, and the country's first female film director and film producer. Her first film, The Law, (2004) was a major success. She was born in Kabul. She returned to Afghanistan from exile to act.

Her film Passing the Rainbow was presented in an art installation at the Chelsea College of Art and Design in 2010.

On 25 August 2020, Sahar was shot by an anonymous gunman while traveling to work in Kabul with her bodyguard and driver. The attack is thought to be connected with her advocacy for women's rights in Afghanistan. She was transported to a hospital.

Filmography

 Commissioner Amanullah (24-part series on Afghan police)
 The Law, 2004
 Passing the Rainbow, 2008 (playing the policewoman and director)
 Kabul Dream Factory, 2011

References

Afghan actresses
1975 births
Afghan film directors
Living people
People from Kabul